Kaltasinsky District (Qaltası rayonı; , Kaltasa kundem) is an administrative and municipal district (raion), one of the fifty-four in the Republic of Bashkortostan, Russia. It is located in the northwest of the republic and borders with Yanaulsky District in the north, Burayevsky District in the east and southeast, Dyurtyulinsky District in the south, and with Krasnokamsky District in the west. Its administrative center is the rural locality (a selo) of Kaltasy. As of the 2010 Census, the total population of the district was 26,268, with the population of Kaltasy accounting for 16.8% of that number.

History
The district was established on August 20, 1930.

Administrative and municipal status
Within the framework of administrative divisions, Kaltasinsky District is one of the fifty-four in the Republic of Bashkortostan. The district is divided into eleven selsoviets, comprising seventy-nine rural localities. As a municipal division, the district is incorporated as Kaltasinsky Municipal District. Its eleven selsoviets are incorporated as eleven  rural settlements within the municipal district. The selo of Kaltasy serves as the administrative center of both the administrative and municipal district.

References

Notes

Sources

Districts of Bashkortostan
States and territories established in 1930